Christopher James Stowers (born August 18, 1974) is a former American professional baseball outfielder and graduated from The Terry College of Business at the University of Georgia. Stowers was a Freshman All-American and All SEC player.  He is considered among the best outfielders in UGA history and played for the Montreal Expos of the Major League Baseball (MLB) in 1999.

References

External links

1974 births
Living people
American expatriate baseball players in Canada
Baseball players from St. Louis
Harrisburg Senators players
Major League Baseball outfielders
Montreal Expos players
Ottawa Lynx players
Vermont Expos players
West Palm Beach Expos players